Santuri  is a village, with a police station, in the Santuri CD block in the Raghunathpur subdivision of the Purulia district in West Bengal, India.

Geography

Location

Area overview
Purulia district forms the lowest step of the Chota Nagpur Plateau. The general scenario is undulating land with scattered hills. Raghunathpur subdivision occupies the northern part of the district. 83.80% of the population of the subdivision  lives in rural areas. However, there are pockets of urbanization and 16.20% of the population lives in urban areas. There are 14 census towns in the subdivision. It is presented in the map given alongside. There is a coal mining area around Parbelia and two thermal power plants are there – the 500 MW Santaldih Thermal Power Station and the 1200 MW Raghunathpur Thermal Power Station. The subdivision has a rich heritage of old temples, some of them belonging to the 11th century or earlier. The Banda Deul is a monument of national importance. The comparatively more recent in historical terms, Panchkot Raj has interesting and intriguing remains in the area.

Demographics
As per 2011 Census of India Santuri had a total population of 2,700 of which 1,390 (51%) were males and 1,310 (49%) were females. Population below 6 years was 322. The total number of literates in Santuri was 1,576 (66.27% of the population over 6 years).

Police station
Santuri police station has jurisdiction over Santuri CD Block. The area covered is 179.69 km2 and the population covered is 78,461.

Transport
State Highway 8 (West Bengal) running from Santaldih (in Purulia district) to Majhdia (in Nadia district) passes through Santuri.

Healthcare
Santuri Primary Health Centre functions with 10 beds.

References

Villages in Purulia district